The 2011 Torneo Omnia Tenis Ciudad Madrid was a professional tennis tournament played on clay courts. It was the first edition of the tournament which was part of the 2011 ATP Challenger Tour. It took place in Madrid, Spain between 26 September and 2 October 2011.

ATP entrants

Seeds

 1 Rankings are as of September 19, 2011.

Other entrants
The following players received wildcards into the singles main draw:
  Iván Arenas-Gualda
  Javier Baños Pantoja
  Thomas Muster
  Roberto Ortega-Olmedo

The following players received entry as a special exempt into the singles main draw:
  Iñigo Cervantes-Huegun

The following players received entry from the qualifying draw:
  Romain Jouan
  Morgan Phillips
  Jan-Lennard Struff
  Peter Torebko

The following players received entry as a lucky loser into the singles main draw:
  Ilya Belyaev

Champions

Singles

 Jérémy Chardy def.  Daniel Gimeno Traver, 6–1, 5–7, 7–6(7–3)

Doubles

 David Marrero /  Rubén Ramírez Hidalgo def.  Daniel Gimeno Traver /  Morgan Phillips, 6–4, 6–7(8–10), [11–9]

External links
Official website
ITF Search
ATP official site

 
Torneo Omnia Tenis Ciudad Madrid
Torneo Omnia Tenis Ciudad Madrid
Madrid
Torneo Omnia Tenis Ciudad Madrid
Torneo Omnia Tenis Ciudad Madrid